Thomas Harold Wood (11 June 1889 – 26 November 1965) was a Canadian Senator. A Liberal, he was appointed to the Senate of Canada on  25 January 1949 on the recommendation of Louis St-Laurent. He represented the Senate division of Regina, Saskatchewan until his death.

References 
 

1889 births
1965 deaths
Canadian senators from Saskatchewan